Laxmilal Chaudhary is a Nepalese politician, belonging to the Nepal Loktantrik Samajbadi Dal. After the 2008 Constituent Assembly election, in which NLSD won one Proportional Representation seat, Chaudhary was selected to represent the party in the Constituent Assembly. Chaudhary stood as a representative for the Saptari District.

References 

Living people
Nepal Loktantrik Samajbadi Dal politicians
Year of birth missing (living people)

Members of the 1st Nepalese Constituent Assembly